"Naughty Marietta" is an American television episode of the 1910 operetta Naughty Marietta. The music for the operetta was composed by Victor Herbert. The book and the lyrics were written by Rida Johnson Young. First telecast live in the United States on January 15, 1955, the conductor for the production was Charles Sanford. The television version, which is slightly different from the operetta, as well as different from the film, was made twenty years after the film version with Jeanette MacDonald and Nelson Eddy. "Naughty Marietta" marked the first musical television appearance by Alfred Drake.

Cast members
 Marietta (Countess d'Altena) — Patrice Munsel
 Captain Richard Warrington — Alfred Drake
 Lieutenant Governor Le Grange — John Conte
 Yvonne — Gale Sherwood
 Louis D'Arc — Donn Driver
 Captain of Ship — Robert Gallagher
 Rudolfo — William LeMassena
 Dancers — Bambi Linn and Rod Alexander (dancer)
 Charles Dagmar and his Punch & Judy.

Plot
It is 1790 and Captain Richard Warrington, of the United States Army, arrives with his infantry in New Orleans ("Tramp! Tramp! Tramp!"), where Warrington wants to see Lieutenant Governor Le Grange, on official business.

Captain Warrington finds the Governor at the casino, where Le Grange's girlfriend, Yvonne, is an entertainer ("We're the Love of Old New Orleans"). When Warrington asks Le Grange for permission to search for the French pirate Bras Piqué, who has been robbing American ships, the Governor refuses the request and orders Captain Warrington and his men to leave New Orleans.

Meanwhile, the pretty and vivacious Marietta has joined the casquette girls who have come to New Orleans, each with a dowry of 500 francs from the King, to marry the colonists. When the ship arrives in port, the casquette girls are eager to leave the ship and meet their future husbands. One of the sailors tries to get Marietta to marry him.  However, Marietta refuses him and states to the casquette girls that she wants to choose the man she marries ("Naughty Marietta").

After the casquette girls disembark from the ship and meet their future husbands, the captain of the ship comments that Marietta has escaped and orders people to search for her. All of the people then leave, including the ship's captain, just as Captain Warrington arrives on the wharf with two of his men. Having been prevented from searching for Bras Piqué on land, Warrington has decided to search for the pirate at sea and wants to charter a ship in which to do so. Because the ship's captain is away from his ship, Captain Warrington sits down to await his return. Hearing 'psst!' a couple of times, he turns around and discovers that the sound is coming from a lady hiding in a large trunk on the wharf.  Marietta asks Captain Warrington to help her escape, stating that she would not marry him.  When Captain Warrington informs her that he is an American, she asks him to take her to America so that she can be free to marry whom she wishes. Captain Warrington says that he does not intend to get married either and he and Marietta decide to be friends ("It Never Can Be Love"). Observing this, from a position of hiding, is the sailor who had been rejected by Marietta.

The ship's captain arrives to see the Governor. Le Grange explains to Yvonne, his girlfriend, that the captain gives him all of the maps showing the routes where English and American ships were sailing in New Orleans' waters.  However, this time the captain informs Le Grange that he had something more valuable — a casquette girl, Marietta, who was actually the Countess d'Altena, who has fled from France to escape a forced marriage with an aged Duke who she had left at the altar.  Le Grange is pleased to hear this and asks where the captain has hidden her.  When the captain states that Marietta had escaped from the ship and that he did not know where she was, Le Grange becomes furious and demands that she be searched for. Governor Le Grange, who is really the pirate Bras Piqué, has decided that he will marry Marietta so that, as her husband, he can receive a pardon for his piracy from the French King (he is also looking forward to receiving the 500 francs which the King had given to her as her casquette girl dowry). Yvonne, who is in love with Le Grange, is very upset that Le Grange wants to marry Marietta instead of her ("Neath the Southern Moon").

Warrington takes Marietta to a gypsy camp so that she can hide with the gypsies as part of their group, and asks their leader, Rudolfo, for help. Marietta gives Rudolfo her dowry money of 500 francs, and he teaches Marietta how to handle the strings of a marionette. Unbeknown to them, the sailor (who Marietta had refused) had followed Warrington and Marietta there. Marietta handles the marionette's strings very well and Rudolfo is pleased with her. Rudolfo then gives Marietta some boys' clothes to wear, so that she can disguise herself as a gypsy boy, and says that Marietta can change inside the enclosed wagon. While waiting for Marietta, Warrington realises that he is falling in love with Marietta — and Marietta realises that she is falling in love with Warrington ("I'm Falling In Love With Someone").

Le Grange and the ship's captain then arrive at the gypsy camp to look for Marietta, the captain having been told, by the sailor, that she can be found there. As the Governor of New Orleans, Le Grange arranges to see the gypsies perform and Marietta sings ("Italian Street Song").  After advising the other men to ("Marry a Marionette"), Le Grange unmasks Marietta's disguise, informing her that, under French Law, he was claiming her, 'Marietta, the casquette girl', as his wife, and stating that they would marry on the following day.  Warrington tries to save her, saying that he had a previous claim because he chose her first, but is thwarted by Le Grange, who comments that the law only applies to French people. Le Grange orders his men to take the struggling Marietta away — while the reluctant Warrington is dragged away in the opposite direction.

The following day, festivities are in full swing in New Orleans at the news of the forthcoming marriage between the Governor and Marietta. Later, a ball is to be held to celebrate their wedding. Marietta, who is very unhappy, is determined that the marriage won't go ahead. In this she is aided by Yvonne, who informs Marietta that Le Grange is the pirate Bras Piqué. Pleading with Marietta for leniency for Bras Piqué, Yvonne mentions that she knows where Captain Warrington is - and says that she will tell Warrington where Bras Piqué can be found.

Marietta is therefore very happy at the ball, much to the surprise of Le Grange, who comments on her change in attitude to their marriage. When Le Grange reveals that he knows that she is the Countess d'Altena, she reveals the knowledge that he is Bras Piqué. Unbeknown to Le Grange, Warrington has arrived at the ball and he and Le Grange then fight a duel, during which Le Grange informs Warrington that Marietta is really a Countess. When the surprised Warrington asks what Marietta is doing in New Orleans, Le Grange explains that Marietta had left France to escape from a forced marriage with an 80-year-old nobleman — to which Warrington comments that Marietta had bad luck with her prospective husbands. Warrington wins the duel, and proves that the Governor is the pirate, following which Le Grange is led away. Although Warrington is in love with Marietta, he is hesitant to ask her to marry him because she is a Countess. However, Marietta persuades him to change his mind and Warrington happily relents ("Ah!  Sweet Mystery of Life").

Songs
 "Tramp! Tramp! Tramp!" — Warrington, Ensemble
 "We're the Love of Old New Orleans" — Yvonne, Ensemble
 "Naughty Marietta" — Marietta, Ensemble
 "It Never Can Be Love" — Warrington, Marietta
 "Neath the Southern Moon" — Yvonne, Le Grange
 "I'm Falling In Love With Someone" — Warrington, Marietta
 "Italian Street Song" — Marietta, Ensemble
 "Marry a Marionette" — Le Grange, Ensemble
 "Ah!  Sweet Mystery of Life" — Warrington, Marietta

DVD release
The live telecast was released on DVD on November 11, 2003 by VAI (Video Artists International). The format of the DVD is 4:3 Black and White, the aspect ratio: is 1.33.1 and the Region Code is 0 (all regions). The DVD Production Coorindator was Robert Scott.

Sources
 The source of the information was the DVD of the operetta.

References
 "Naughty Marietta" — Joyner Library – Academic Library Services

External links
 
 "Naughty Marietta" — Patrice Munsel
 "Naughty Marietta" — Royal Opera House DVDs [when accessed on September 5, 2016, this link was no longer active]
 

1955 American television episodes
English-language operettas
Operas by Victor Herbert
Music of New Orleans
Max Liebman Presents